Relevo is a sports website written in Spanish and based in Madrid. It covers national and international sports, with a focus on Gen Z and millennial audiences. It is owned by Spanish media group Vocento. It launched on October 6, 2022, after four months of providing editorial coverage on TikTok, Twitch, Instagram, and Twitter.

Content and features 
Relevo focuses on sports-related topics. This differs from the trend of diversifying content observed in mainstream Spanish sports websites, such as Marca and Diario As. Relevo claimed to avoid clickbait techniques to attract users.

Relevos coverage includes a mix of original reporting, videos, and in-depth analysis. Its business model is 'advertising-only'. Vocento stated that it does not expect the project to be EBITDA-positive until 2025.

In the context of sports, the Spanish word "relevo" refers to a member of a team handing off a baton or taking a leg on a relay race competition, such as those typically held in track, cycling, or swimming.

History 
Óscar Campillo, former editor of Marca and then PR director at Vocento, started developing the project in December 2021, supported by a small group of former Marca and As journalists.  In May 2021, Relevo started a live Twitter thread where a headcount of the team is kept. As of October 2022, this thread featured 73 people.

Relevo started publishing content on TikTok in May 2022. In the following weeks, it launched profiles on Twitter and Instagram, as well as a 3-hour weekday daily live show on Twitch. As of October 2022, Relevo had amassed a combined following of 312,000 user profiles amongst the four platforms.

Relevo's launch on social networks was covered by Spanish media experts as an example of a successful strategy to build a social media following.

References

External links

2022 establishments in Spain
Association football websites
Sports mass media in Spain
Spanish-language websites
Spanish news websites
Internet properties established in 2022
Companies based in Madrid